David Marrero and Fernando Verdasco were the defending champions but decided not to participate.
Simone Bolelli and Fabio Fognini won the title, defeating Nicholas Monroe and Simon Stadler in the final, 6–3, 6–2.

Seeds

Draw

Draw

References
 Main Draw

Copa Claro - Doubles
2013 Doubles